Virginia "Ginny" Thrasher (born February 28, 1997) is an American sports shooter who won a gold medal in the women's 10 meter air rifle at the 2016 Summer Olympics in Rio de Janeiro, Brazil. She won the first gold medal awarded at the 2016 Olympics.

Thrasher's gold medal came during the first time she had competed in the Olympics, beating two Chinese athletes, previous Olympic gold medalists Du Li and Yi Siling. Thrasher's victory was considered a surprise as she had no major international competition experience prior to the 2016 Olympics.

Before the 2016 Olympics, Thrasher wanted to be a figure skater. She has said she was never any good and by her freshman year of high school, she realized she had no future in it. She switched sports in 2011 after going hunting with her grandfather.

Personal life

Thrasher grew up in Springfield, Virginia, and graduated from West Springfield High School in 2015. She is the daughter of Roger and Valerie Thrasher and has older two brothers. She graduated summa cum laude from West Virginia University in 2019, where she majored in biomedical engineering.

Thrasher serves on the athlete advisory team for Country Roads Trust, a West Virginia-based company formed in 2022 to help student-athletes take advantage of their new ability to monetize their Name, Image, and Likeness. Other WVU alumni on the advisory team include former NBA player Jerry West, former NFL player Pat McAfee, and gymnast Jaida Lawrence Hart.

2016 Rio Olympics

10m air rifle
Thrasher received the first gold medal awarded at the 2016 Summer Olympics in Rio de Janeiro. She qualified 6th in the first round of the women's 10m air rifle competition with a score of 416.3. She went on to win the final of that event with an Olympic Record score of 208.0, one point ahead of silver medalist Du Li of China.

50m rifle three positions
Thrasher missed the finals of the 50m rifle three positions by one point, finishing with a score of 581.

College Career 
Ginny Thrasher was a member of the West Virginia University Rifle Team from 2015-2019. During that time, she earned twelve All-American Honors as well as two NCAA individual titles and two team NCAA team titles.

References

External links
Team USA Profile
Instagram
WVU Profile
Rio 2016 Olympic Profile
ISSF Athlete Profile

1997 births
Living people
American female sport shooters
Medalists at the 2016 Summer Olympics
Shooters at the 2016 Summer Olympics
Olympic gold medalists for the United States in shooting
West Virginia Mountaineers rifle shooters
People from Springfield, Virginia
Sportspeople from Fairfax County, Virginia
Sportspeople from Rome, New York
Pan American Games medalists in shooting
Pan American Games bronze medalists for the United States
Shooters at the 2019 Pan American Games
Medalists at the 2019 Pan American Games
21st-century American women
West Virginia University alumni